The BFI IMAX is an IMAX cinema in the South Bank district of London, just north of Waterloo station. It is owned and operated by the British Film Institute. From 2012 until 2022, it had been operated by Odeon Cinemas.

The cinema is located in the centre of a roundabout junction with Waterloo Road to the south-east, Stamford Street to the north-east, York Road to the south-west and Waterloo Bridge to the north-west.

History

BFI IMAX was designed by Bryan Avery of Avery Associates Architects and completed in May 1999. The screen is the largest in Britain (20m high and 26m wide). It has a seating capacity of 500 and a 14,000 Watt digital surround sound system. Although the site is surrounded by traffic and has an underground line just four metres below, the architects and engineers accounted for this in their design and the entire upper structure sits on anti vibration bearings to prevent noise propagation.

The cinema won several awards at the time of opening, including a Design Council Millennium Product Award in 1999 and a Civic Trust Award in 2000.

In 2012, the screen was replaced and a digital IMAX projector was installed alongside the existing 70mm projector. In July 2012, the BFI announced that Odeon Cinemas had been selected to operate it for the next five years, with the option of termination after three years. Odeon will maintain the film programmes, and booking of tickets online and by telephone. This also gives customers the opportunity to watch operas on the giant screen. The BFI will retain a great deal of power over the cinema's operation, however, including parts of the film schedule, the name and the technical operation.

To start this move to mainstream cinema, the BFI London IMAX theatre celebrated by having sold 66,000 pre-booked tickets for The Dark Knight Rises in just 5 weeks, giving a total sale in tickets of £1,000,000 even before the premiere of the movie.

On 13 June 2022, the BFI announced that its ten year concessions deal with Odeon would end on 19 July 2022, with the BFI regaining control of operations. The cinema will close on this date, with a planned re-opening on 22 July.  Changes to the cinema are planned to be unveiled in the Autumn.

Other IMAX cinemas in London

London has another traditional IMAX cinema at the Science Museum in South Kensington and in December 2008 gained IMAX digital cinemas at Odeon cinemas in Greenwich and Wimbledon. In 2011, a digital IMAX screen was also opened at the Odeon in Swiss Cottage.

Screen size comparative to other UK large screens

The BFI London IMAX is the largest cinema screen in the United Kingdom. It measures 26.5m wide by 20m high with a total screen size of 530m². However, if showing a film with an aspect ratio of 2.39:1, only 293m² of the screen will be in use, or 379m² for a 1.85:1 film, or 491m² for an IMAX 1.43:1 film. The auditorium seats 500, including 2 wheelchair spaces.

The BFI IMAX is followed in screen size area:
 The Vue Manchester Printworks IMAX. 26.3m by 18.8m with a total screen size of 495m² (289m² for a 2.39:1 film, 374m² for a 1.85:1 film, 484m² for an IMAX 1.43:1 film). Seats 377.
 The Glasgow Science Centre IMAX. 25m by 18.9m with a total screen size of 472m² (262m² for a 2.39:1 film, 338m² for a 1.85:1 film, 437m² for an IMAX 1.43:1 film). Seats 382.
 The Empire, Leicester Square IMAX, London. 26.5m by 15.6m with a total screen size of 413m².(294m² for a 2.39:1 film, 380m² for a 1.85:1 film, 348m² for an IMAX 1.43:1 film). Seats 728.
 The London Science Museum IMAX. 24.3m by 16.8m with a total screen size of 408m² (247m² for a 2.39:1 film, 319m² for a 1.85:1 film, 404m² for an IMAX 1.43:1 film).
 The Cineworld IMAX, York. 22.3m by 16.8m with a total screen size of 374.6m² (208m² for a 2.39:1 film, 269m² for a 1.85:1 film, 348m² for an IMAX 1.43:1 film). Seats 385. Opened Friday 13th December 2019
 The Cineworld IMAX, Ashford. 22.5m by 16.5m with a total screen size of 371m² (212m² for a 2.39:1 film, 274m² for a 1.85:1 film, 354m² for an IMAX 1.43:1 film)
 The Cineworld IMAX, Leeds. 24m by 14m with a total screen size of 336m² (241m² for a 2.39:1 film, 311m² for a 1.85:1 film, 280m² for an IMAX 1.43:1 film)
 The National Science and Media Museum, Bradford. 20m by 16.5m with a total screen size of 330m² (167m² for a 2.39:1 film, 216m² for a 1.85:1 film, 280m² for an IMAX 1.43:1 film). Seats 270. Europe's first permanent IMAX screen, finished in April 1983
 The Pepsi IMAX Cinema at the London Trocadero (closed in 1999) 19.8m by 15.8m with a total screen size of 313m² (164m² for a 2.39:1 film, 212m² for a 1.85:1 film). Seated 300.
 The Giant Screen at Millennium Point, Birmingham (closed in 2015). 21.3m by 12.6 with a total screen size of 268m² (190m² for a 2.39:1 film, 245m² for a 1.85:1 film). Seated 385.
 The Cineworld IMAX, Sheffield. 21.3m x 12m, total screen size of 255.6m². Seats 691. (Screen 7)
 The Superscreen at the Cineworld O2, London. 22m by 9.2m with a total screen size of 202m² (157m² for a 1.85:1 film). Seats 776 (Screen 11).
 The Odeon IMAX, Milton Keynes Stadium. 18.5m by 10.32m with a total screen size of 191m².(143m² for a 2.39:1 film, 185m² for a 1.85:1 film) Seats 387
 The Cineworld IMAX, Hemel Hempstead. 18.3m x 10m, total screen size of 183m². Seats 281
 The VueXtreme screen at Vue Westfield London, 18m by 10m with a total screen size of 180m².
 The VueXtreme screen at Vue Westfield Stratford City, 18m by 10m with a total screen size of 180m².
 The Rheged Centre, Penrith, Cumbria. 18m by 14.63m with a total screen size of 263.34 m2.(144m² for a 2.39:1 film) Seats 262
 The Liverpool One Odeon IMAX, Liverpool. 17.99m x 9.76m for a total screen size of 176m². Seats 288
 The Cineworld IMAX, Nottingham. 18.9m x 9.1m, total screen size of 172m². Seats 425. (Screen 10)
 The Odeon IMAX, Cardiff. 16.8m by 7.9m for a total screen size of 133m² (118m² for a 2.39:1 film, 115m² for a 1.85:1 film). Seats 209.
 The Odeon IMAX, Kingston. 15.2m wide x 7.23m with a total screen size of 110m² (97m² for a 2.39:1 film, 97m² for a 1.85:1 film) Seats 428.
 The Odeon Dolby cinema, London Leicester Square. 400 speaker Dolby Atmos audio array. 2x Christie 4K 6P projectors. Seats 794.

See also
 Cardboard City (previous name of site)
 List of IMAX venues

References

External links

 
 Odeon London IMAX website
 Avery Associates Architects
 IMAX Corporation

Cinemas in London
IMAX venues
Buildings and structures in the London Borough of Lambeth
Domes
Tourist attractions in the London Borough of Lambeth
Recipients of Civic Trust Awards